A chronozone or chron is a unit in chronostratigraphy, defined by events such as 
geomagnetic reversals (magnetozones), or based on the presence of specific fossils  (biozone or biochronozone).
According to the International Commission on Stratigraphy, the term "chronozone" refers to the rocks formed during a particular time period, while "chron" refers to that time period.

Although non-hierarchical, chronozones have been recognized as useful markers or benchmarks of time in the rock record. Chronozones are non-hierarchical in that chronozones do not need to correspond across geographic or geologic boundaries, nor be equal in length. Although a former, early constraint required that a chronozone be defined as smaller than a geological stage. Another early use was hierarchical in that Harland et al. (1989) used "chronozone" for the slice of time smaller than a faunal stage defined in biostratigraphy.
   The ICS superseded these earlier usages in 1994.

The key factor in designating an internationally acceptable chronozone is whether the overall fossil column is clear, unambiguous, and widespread. Some accepted chronozones contain others, and certain larger chronozones have been designated which span whole defined geological time units, both large and small.
For example, the chronozone Pliocene is a subset of the chronozone Neogene, and the chronozone Pleistocene is a subset of the chronozone Quaternary.

See also
Body form
Chronology (geology)
European Mammal Neogene
Geologic time scale
North American Land Mammal Age
Type locality (geology)
List of GSSPs

References

 Hedberg, H.D., (editor), International stratigraphic guide: A guide to stratigraphic classification, terminology, and procedure, New York, John Wiley and Sons, 1976

External links
 International Stratigraphic Chart from the International Commission on Stratigraphy
 USA National Park Service
 Washington State University
 Web Geological Time Machine
 Eon or Aeon, Math Words - An alphabetical index
The Global Boundary Stratotype Section and Point (GSSP): overview
Chart of The Global Boundary Stratotype Sections and Points (GSSP): chart
Geotime chart displaying geologic time periods compared to the fossil record

Chronostratigraphy
Geochronology
Geologic time scales
Geology terminology
Geological units
Historical geology
Paleogeography
Paleobiology
Stratigraphy
Units of time